Opocunonia is a monotypic genus of trees in the family Cunoniaceae. Its only species is Opocunonia nymanii, synonym Caldcluvia nymanii. It is native to New Guinea and the Bismarck Archipelago.

References

Cunoniaceae
Monotypic Oxalidales genera